City West-Denver is a suburb of Johannesburg, South Africa. It is located in Region 8.

Johannesburg Region F